The members of the 24th Manitoba Legislature were elected in the Manitoba general election held in June 1953. The legislature sat from February 2, 1954 to April 30, 1958.

The Liberal-Progressive Party led by Douglas Lloyd Campbell formed the government.

Errick Willis of the Progressive Conservative Party was Leader of the Opposition. Duff Roblin defeated Willis at a leadership convention in June 1954 to become party leader.

In 1957, the Employment Standards Act was passed; it was intended to standardize conditions of employment such as hours of work and termination of employment. In the same year, the Equal Pay Act was also passed, which provided for equal pay for equal work within the same organization.

Nicholas Bachynsky served as speaker for the assembly.

There were four sessions of the 24th Legislature:

John Stewart McDiarmid was Lieutenant Governor of Manitoba.

Members of the Assembly 
The following members were elected to the assembly in 1953:

Notes:

By-elections 
By-elections were held to replace members for various reasons:

Notes:

References 

Terms of the Manitoba Legislature
1954 establishments in Manitoba
1958 disestablishments in Manitoba